Community Unit School District 200 (CUSD 200) based in Wheaton, Illinois is a public unit school district mainly serving the communities of Wheaton and Warrenville. CUSD 200 also services portions of Carol Stream, Winfield, and West Chicago, as well as adjacent unincorporated areas within DuPage County. For the 2019-20 school year, there were a total of 12,319 students enrolled in twenty schools, ranging from preschool through 12th grade. The district has expenditures of approximately $19,053 per pupil, as of 2018.

Schools
High Schools

There were 3,906 students enrolled in the two high schools, as of 2020.

Middle Schools

There were 2,818 students enrolled in the four middle schools, as of 2020.

Elementary Schools

There were 5,595 students enrolled in thirteen elementary schools, and one early childhood center, as of 2020.

Legal proceedings
In May 2009, the Illinois Supreme Court issued a decision in Stern v. Wheaton-Warrenville Community Unit School District 200.  The case revolved around a 2006 request, through the Freedom of Information Act (FOIA), for a copy of the superintendent's contract.  The district repeatedly denied this request, citing that the request would violate the superintendent's right to privacy.

The initial ruling in the circuit court was to agree with the school district.  The appellate court found that the contract was not exempt from disclosure, but that there was a constitutional issue in the original complaint that was not being addressed.  The Supreme Court agreed that the contract was not exempt from an FOIA request, provided that care was taken not to release any information (such as a Social Security Number or bank account information).  The decision was unanimous.

References

External links
 

School districts in DuPage County, Illinois
Carol Stream, Illinois
Warrenville, Illinois
West Chicago, Illinois
Wheaton, Illinois
Winfield, Illinois